Sozma Qala District is a district of Sar-e Pol Province, Afghanistan.  The estimated population in 2019 was 54,970.

See also
 Districts of Afghanistan

References

Districts of Sar-e Pol Province